Kamaldeep Bhui is an expert on cultural psychiatry, ethnic disparities in psychiatric disorders, and cultural competency in mental health care. He is a Professor of Psychiatry at the University of Oxford and  Honorary Professor in the Center for Psychiatry at Queen Mary University of London. In 2017, Bhui was named a Commander of Order of the British Empire (CBE) in the Queen's New Years' Honors List in honor of his services to mental health care and research.

Bhui has served as Editor in Chief of the British Journal of Psychiatry, as Editor of the International Journal of Culture and Mental Health, and as Director of the World Psychiatric Association Collaborating Centre.

Biography 
Bhui was born in Kenya to a family of Punjabi Sikh background, and educated in the United Kingdom.

Bhui graduated from the United Medical & Dental Schools of Guy’s and St Thomas’ Hospitals with a medical degree in 1988. He holds postgraduate qualifications in psychiatry, mental health studies, epidemiology, and psychotherapy.  He completed clinical training in London, secured a first Consultant appointment in 1999, followed in 2000 and 2003 by Consultant/Senior Lecturer and Consultant/Professorial posts in East London Foundation Trust and Queen Mary University of London. Bhui was subsequently appointed Professor of Cultural Psychiatry and Epidemiology at the Research Centre for Psychiatry at St Bartholomew’s Hospital and the London School of Medicine.

Bhui is co-founder of Careif, an international mental health charity.

Books 

 Bhugra, D., & Bhui, K. (2001). Cross-cultural psychiatry: a practical guide. Arnold. 
 Bhugra, D., & Bhui, K. (Eds.). (2018). Textbook of cultural psychiatry. Cambridge University Press. 
 Bhugra, D., Bhui, K., Wong, S. Y. S., & Gilman, S. E. (Eds.). (2018). Oxford textbook of public mental health. Oxford University Press. 
 Bhui, K. E. (Ed.) (2002). Racism and mental health: Prejudice and suffering. Jessica Kingsley Publishers. 
 Bhui, K. (Ed.). (2013). Elements of culture and mental health: critical questions for clinicians. RCPsych Publications. 
 Bhui, K. and Bhugra, D. (Eds.) (2020). Terrorism, Violent Radicalisation and Mental Health. Oxford University Press.

References

External links 
 Faculty Homepage, University of Oxford
 

Living people
Year of birth missing (living people)
British psychiatrists
Academics of the University of Oxford
Principal Fellows of the Higher Education Academy
Kenyan emigrants to the United Kingdom